Nicolas Meister may refer to:
 Nicolas Meister (tennis)
 Nicolas Meister (footballer)

See also
 Nick Meister, Canadian curler